Lecanora microloba is a species of crustose and areolate lichen in the family Lecanoraceae. Found in Poland, it was formally described as a new species in 2010 by Lucyna Śliwa and Adam Flakus. Here, in vegetation characteristic of the subnival belt  (i.e., just below the snow line and above the tree line), the lichen was found growing on granite rock that was mylonitized. Lecanora microloba contains secondary compounds: gyrophoric acid, usnic acid, and zeorin as major metabolites, and an unidentified terpene. A distinguishing characteristic of the lichen is the presence of coarse granules in the epithecium (the tissue layer above the asci) that are distinctly bright when shone with polarized light. The specific epithet microloba refers to the minute lobe-like areoles in the thallus margins.

See also
List of Lecanora species

References

microloba
Lichen species
Lichens described in 2010
Lichens of Central Europe
Taxa named by Adam Grzegorz Flakus